Kuroshioturris hyugaensis is a species of sea snail, a marine gastropod mollusk in the family Turridae, the turrids.

Fossils of † Gemmula (Kuroshioturris) hyugaensis have been found in Lowest Pliocene strata, Miyazaki Prefecture , Japan.

Distribution
This marine species occurs off Japan.

References

 Shuto T. (1961). Conacean gastropods from the Miyazaki Group (Paleontological study of the Miyazaki Group-IX). Memoirs of the Faculty of Science, Kyushu University, series D, Geology. 11(2): 71-150, pls 3-10.
 Higo, S., Callomon, P. & Goto, Y. (1999) Catalogue and Bibliography of the Marine Shell-Bearing Mollusca of Japan. Elle Scientific Publications, Yao, Japan, 749 p

External links
  Tucker, J.K. 2004 Catalog of recent and fossil turrids (Mollusca: Gastropoda). Zootaxa 682:1-1295

hyugaensis
Gastropods described in 1961